Mirandolina (H. 346) is a comic opera in three acts by Bohuslav Martinů, with a libretto (in Italian) by the composer after Carlo Goldoni's 1751 comedy La locandiera (The Mistress of the Inn). Salieri had an opera (dramma giocoso) on the same subject premiered at the Vienna Kärtnertortheater in 1773.

The opera was written in 1953-4. It incorporates in places stretches of spoken dialogue between the characters, against an orchestral background. The opera was premiered on 17 May 1959 at the Prague National Theatre, Czechoslovakia (shortly before the composer's death), when it was conducted by Václav Kašlik.

David Pountney has described the opera as "the work where Martinů's strain of fast-moving, neo-Classical style comes into its own... finding room for witty and ironic musical references to Italian madrigals, French vaudeville and Italian opera buffa". Martinů's biographer Brian Large noted several highlights from the score: a coloratura aria in Act 1 Scene 6 for Mirandolina as well as waltzes, intermezzos and a saltarello, the latter having been recorded in 1973 by the Czech State Philharmonic Orchestra Brno conducted by František Jílek.

Performance history

The first production of Mirandolina remained in the stage repertoire at the Prague National Theatre until 1963 and the opera was revived there in 1980-82. It was staged as part of the Wexford Festival in 2002 with Daniela Bruera in the title role conducted by Riccardo Frizza, the performance eventually being issued on CD.

The UK premiere was given by Garsington Opera in 2009 with Juanita Lascarro in the title role, and conducted by Martin André.

In 2013-14 Mirandolina was seen in Ostrava, at the National Moravian-Silesian Theatre, then the German premiere of the original Italian version was given in March 2014 at the Theater Gießen conducted by Michael Hofstetter and directed by Andriy Zholdak; the Bavarian State Opera's Opernstudio performed the work in April 2014 conducted by Alexander Prior and directed by Christian Stückl, and in June it was staged in Bratislava, at the Slovak National Theatre.

Roles

Synopsis
Mirandolina the inn-keeper is courted by various noblemen at her house in Florence.
Two of them try to vie with each other to seduce her, declaring that they are passionately in love with her, but having enchanted them she drops them. Another admirer is the sardonic misogynist Ripafratta whom she sees as a challenge to win.

Mirandolina therefore decides to lure the Cavaliere and seduce him. She sets out the tricks she is playing with Forlimpopoli and Albafiorita, and tries to use flattery and charm to gull Ripafratta.
He however, becomes serious, playing on his rank and flushed with his first real love, and is furious when Mirandolina rejects him. Two elderly actresses, Ortensia and Dejanira pretend in vain that they are not upper class.

Mirandolina had all along been keen on her faithful waiter Fabrizio and ends up marrying him, having tested his fidelity, as a protection against the livid Ripafratta.

Recording
The 2002 Wexford production was recorded by the BBC and published on CD in 2004 by Supraphon; with the Belarus National Philharmonic Orchestra conducted by Riccardo Frizza.

References
Notes

Sources
 New Grove Dictionary of Opera
 Review of opera on andante.com
 Martinu Institute website

Italian-language operas
Operas by Bohuslav Martinů
Operas
1959 operas
Operas based on plays
Operas based on works by Carlo Goldoni